NGC 2204 is an open cluster in the Canis Major constellation. It was discovered by William Herschel on 6 February 1785.

References

External links
 

Canis Major
Open clusters
2204